Scylaspora is a genus of Silu-Devonian spore, which has been found attached to stick-like sporangia.  The spores are common and widespread in sediments of this age.

References

Early Devonian plants
Wenlock first appearances
Early Devonian genus extinctions
Prehistoric plant genera